Andrew John Stoner  (born 14 January 1960), an Australian former politician, was a member of the New South Wales Legislative Assembly representing Oxley from 1999 state election to 2015.

Stoner was the Leader of the New South Wales National Party from 2003 to 2014, and Deputy Premier of New South Wales from 2011 to 2014. He was the Minister for Trade and Investment, and Minister for Regional Infrastructure and Services, between 2011 and 2014; and the Minister for Tourism and Major Events, the Minister for Small Business, and the Minister for the North Coast, between April and October 2014 in the Baird government.

Biography
Stoner was born in 1960 in Brisbane, Queensland, before his family moved to Wauchope, New South Wales. He attended the Queensland Institute of Technology from 1979 to 1985, receiving a Bachelor of Business, and later James Cook University of North Queensland in 1993, receiving a Master of Business Administration with first class honours.  He became an employment agency manager and a regional manager in the Australian Public Service before entering parliament.

Stoner joined the National Party of Australia and was elected to the New South Wales Legislative Assembly on 27 March 1999 for Oxley. He was appointed the National Party Deputy Whip in his first term in office and rose to become Shadow Minister for Emergency Services and Shadow Minister for Sport and Recreation from 2002 to 2003. However, after the Liberal-National Coalition lost the 2003 election, the then Nationals leader George Souris stood aside and Stoner was elected in his place.

Stoner helped lead the Coalition to a landslide victory in the 2011 state election. The Liberals won a majority in their own right (51 seats)--the first time that the main non-Labor party in New South Wales had won an outright majority under the Liberal banner. Although O'Farrell could have theoretically governed alone, he chose to retain the coalition with the Nationals.  In a departure from normal practice, O'Farrell and Stoner were sworn in as an interim two-man government on 28 March even though counting was still underway.

In a 2013 interview marking his ten–year anniversary as leader of the Nationals, Stoner reflected that:

Owing to the resignation of Barry O'Farrell as Premier, and the subsequent ministerial reshuffle by Mike Baird, in April 2014 in addition to his existing responsibilities as a minister, Stoner was appointed as the Minister for Tourism and Major Events, as the Minister for Small Business, and as the Minister for the North Coast.

In the same reshuffle Premier Baird acceded to Stoner's request to dump his predecessor as Nationals leader George Souris from Cabinet, a request that was revealed when Souris announced his retirement from politics later in 2014 on 27 September.

On 15 October, Stoner stood down as National Party leader and as deputy premier, citing family reasons. He also announced he would retire from politics at the next election. Troy Grant was elected unopposed as his successor.

Stoner is now a company director, consultant and adviser to several companies.

Personal life
A keen surfer and father of six, Stoner now resides in Port Macquarie on the Mid North Coast. He separated from his former wife in 2016, divorced in 2019 and was remarried in 2020, to Dr Caroline Hong.

See also
 O'Farrell ministry
 Baird ministry
 Shadow Ministry of Barry O'Farrell

References

|-

|-

|-

|-

1960 births
Living people
Members of the New South Wales Legislative Assembly
National Party of Australia members of the Parliament of New South Wales
Members of the Order of Australia
Australian monarchists
Deputy Premiers of New South Wales
Queensland University of Technology alumni
People from Brisbane
James Cook University alumni
21st-century Australian politicians